Tetragonoderus immaculatus is a species of beetle in the family Carabidae. It was described by Laferte-Senectere in 1853.

References

immaculatus
Beetles described in 1853